Blaniulus lichtensteini is a species of  millipede in the Blaniulidae family that is endemic to France.

References

Julida
Millipedes of Europe
Animals described in 1921